Olson House  may refer to:

Places and structures

United States
(by state, then city/town)

 Donald and Helen Olsen House, Berkeley, California, listed on the National Register of Historic Places (NRHP)
 Lena Olsen House, Pascagoula, Mississippi, listed on the NRHP in Jackson County, Mississippi
 Olsen House (Helena, Montana), NRHP-listed
 Hans Peter Olsen House, Fountain Green, Utah, listed on the NRHP in Sanpete County, Utah
 Lars and Christina Olsen House, Orem, Utah, NRHP-listed
 Ben Olsen House, Vader, Washington, listed on the NRHP in Lewis County, Washington

See also
 Olson House (disambiguation)